La duquesa is a Mexican telenovela produced by Valentín Pimstein for Telesistema Mexicano in 1966.

Cast 
Sara García as La Duquesa
Miguel Córcega
Blanca Sánchez
Enrique Aguilar
Estela Chacón
Angelines Fernández
Polo Ortín
Belem Díaz
Pura Vargas
Mauricio Davison
Pedro Vargas

References

External links 

Mexican telenovelas
1966 telenovelas
Televisa telenovelas
Spanish-language telenovelas
1966 Mexican television series debuts
1966 Mexican television series endings